Amiir Nuur Secondary (English Amir Nur Secondary) is located in Garbahaarreey, the capital of Gedo Region. The school is named in honour of the 13th century Amiir of Harar who belongs to ancestors of many current Garbahaarreey residents. It was opened on May 5, 2008. The school is one of the highest rated secondary/high schools in Somalia, and was the only school who had the most students in the top 100.

References

External links
 Amiir Nuur Secondary

Schools in Somalia